Nori  is a dried edible seaweed used in Japanese cuisine, made from species of the red algae genus Pyropia, including P. yezonesis and P. tenera. It has a strong and distinctive flavor, and is often used to wrap rolls of sushi or onigiri (rice balls).

The finished dried sheets are made by a shredding and rack-drying process that resembles papermaking. They are sold in packs in grocery stores for culinary purposes. Since nori sheets easily absorb water from the air and degrade, a desiccant is needed when storing nori for any significant time.

History 

Originally, the term nori was generic and referred to seaweeds, including hijiki. One of the earliest descriptions of nori is dated to around the eighth century. In the Taihō Code that was enacted in 701, nori already was included in the form of taxation. Local people were described as drying nori in Hitachi Province fudoki (721–721), and harvesting of nori was mentioned in Izumo Province fudoki (713–733), showing that nori was used as food from ancient times. In Utsubo Monogatari, written around 987, nori was recognized as a common food. Nori had been consumed as paste form until the sheet form (Ita-nori 板海苔) was invented in Asakusa, Edo (contemporary Tokyo), around 1750 in the Edo period through the method of Japanese paper-making.

The word "nori" first appeared in an English-language publication in C. P. Thunberg's Trav., published in 1796. It was used in conjugation as "Awa nori", probably referring to what now is called aonori.

When Japan was in need of high food production after WWII, production of nori was in decline. They sought to supplement their traditional reliance upon harvesting the natural product from the sea. Due to a lack of understanding of nori's three-stage life cycle, however, those attempting to produce nori artificially did not understand why their cultivation methods were not being productive with nori. The industry was rescued by knowledge derived from the work of British phycologist Kathleen Mary Drew-Baker, who had been researching the organism Porphyria umbilicalis that grew in the seas around Wales and was harvested for food (bara lafwr or bara lawr), as in Japan. Her work was discovered by Japanese scientists who applied it to artificial methods of seeding and growing the nori, rescuing the industry. Kathleen Baker was hailed in Japan as the "Mother of the Sea" and a statue was erected in her memory. She is still revered as the savior of the Japanese nori industry.

In the twenty-first century, the Japanese nori industry faces a new decline due to increased competition from seaweed producers in China and Korea and an increase in domestic sales tax.

The word nori started to be used widely in the United States and the product (imported in dry form from Japan) became widely available at natural food stores and Asian-American grocery stores in the 1960s due to the macrobiotic movement  and in the 1970s with the increase of sushi bars and Japanese restaurants.

Production 
Production and processing of nori is an advanced form of agriculture. The biology of Pyropia, although complicated, now is well understood, and this knowledge is used to control the production process. Farming takes place in the sea where the Pyropia plants grow attached to nets suspended at the sea surface and where the farmers operate from boats. The plants grow rapidly, requiring approximately 45 days from "seeding" until the first harvest. Multiple harvests can be taken from a single seeding, typically at approximately ten-day intervals. Harvesting is accomplished using mechanical harvesters of a variety of configurations. Processing of raw product is mostly accomplished by highly automated machines that accurately duplicate traditional manual processing steps, but with much improved efficiency and consistency.

Several grades of nori are available in the United States.  The most common (and least expensive) grades are imported from China, costing approximately six cents per sheet.  At the high end, ranging up to 90 cents per sheet, are "delicate shin-nori" (nori from the first of the year's several harvests) cultivated in the Ariake Sea, off the island of Kyushu in Japan.

China produces approximately a third of this amount.

Culinary uses 
Nori is commonly used as a wrap for sushi and onigiri.  It is also a garnish or flavoring in noodle preparations and soups. It is most typically toasted prior to consumption (yaki-nori). A common secondary product is toasted and flavored nori (ajitsuke-nori), in which a flavoring mixture (variable, but typically soy sauce, sugar, sake, mirin, and seasonings) is applied in combination with the toasting process. Nori also is eaten by making it into a soy sauce-flavored paste, nori no tsukudani. Sometimes it also is used as a form of food decoration.

A related product, prepared from the unrelated green algae Monostroma and Enteromorpha, is called aonori ( literally blue/green nori) and it is used as an herb on everyday meals, such as okonomiyaki and yakisoba.

Nutrition 
Raw seaweed is 85% water, 6% protein, 5% carbohydrates, and has negligible fat (table). In a 100 gram reference amount, seaweed is a rich source (20% or more of the Daily Value, DV) of vitamin A, vitamin C, riboflavin, and folate (table). Seaweed is a moderate source (less than 20% DV) of niacin, iron, and zinc. Seaweed has a high content of iodine, providing a substantial amount in just one gram. A 2014 study reported that dried purple laver ("nori") contains vitamin B12 in sufficient quantities to meet the RDA requirement (Vitamin B12 content: 77.6 μg /100 g dry weight). By contrast, however, a 2017 review concluded that vitamin B12 may be destroyed during metabolism or is converted into inactive B12 analogs during drying and storage. The Academy of Nutrition and Dietetics stated in 2016 that nori is not an adequate source of vitamin B12 for humans.

Health risks 
Nori may contain toxic metals (arsenic and cadmium), whose levels are highly variable among nori products. It also contains amphipod allergens that may cause serious allergic reactions, especially in highly sensitized crustacean-allergic people. Therefore, daily consumption of high amounts of dried nori is discouraged.

Similar food 
The red algae genera is also consumed in Korean cuisine as gim and in Wales and Ireland as laverbread.

See also 
 
 
 
 
 , – river algae often eaten in sheets in Laos
 
 Porphyra

References

External links 

 Suria Link Seaplants Handbook
 Nori 海苔 : Sushi Ingredients
 Description and images of cultivation and harvesting
 Nori Dishes (w/video)
 Marutoku Nori: About Nori
 Nori Steps Away From the Sushi

Bangiophyceae
Edible seaweeds
Japanese cuisine
Japanese cuisine terms
Flora of Japan
Marine biota of Asia